Loring Heights may refer to:
 Loring Heights (Atlanta), neighborhood of Atlanta
 Stevens Square/Loring Heights, neighborhood of Minneapolis